The 2004 Euro Beach Soccer Cup was the sixth Euro Beach Soccer Cup, one of Europe's two major beach soccer championships at the time, held in June 2004, in Lisbon, Portugal.
Hosts Portugal won the championship, claiming their fourth successive title and fifth overall, with Spain finishing second. Italy beat France in the third place playoff to finish third and fourth respectively.

Eight teams participated in the tournament who played in a straightforward knockout tournament, starting with the quarterfinals, with extra matches deciding the nations who finished in fifth, sixth, seventh and eighth place.

Participating nations

Matches

Main tournament

Fifth to eighth place deciding matches
The following matches took place between the losing nations in the quarterfinals to determine the final standings of the nations finishing in fifth to eighth place. The semifinals took place on the same day of the semifinals of the main tournament and the playoffs took place on the day of the final.

Winners

Final standings

References

Euro Beach Soccer Cup
Beach soccer in Portugal
2004 in beach soccer
2004 in Portuguese sport